Manuel Bertrán de Lis y Ribes (28 February 1806, in Valencia, Spain – 29 July 1869, in Segovia, Spain) was a Spanish politician who served twice as Minister of State, between 1851 and 1852.

|-

|-

Economy and finance ministers of Spain
Foreign ministers of Spain
1806 births
1869 deaths
Moderate Party (Spain) politicians
19th-century Spanish politicians